Lanji Assembly constituency is one of the 230 Vidhan Sabha (Legislative Assembly) constituencies of Madhya Pradesh state in central India.

It is part of Balaghat District.

Members of Legislative Assembly

As a constituency of Madhya Bharat
1951, Tejlal Tembhare Indian National Congress

As a constituency of Madhya Pradesh

Election results

2013 results

See also
 Lanji

References

Assembly constituencies of Madhya Pradesh